The NPL State League 2 South Australia is the third tier state-level football (soccer) competition in South Australia, ranked fourth tier in the national pyramid. The league are part of the National Premier Leagues (NPL) structure implemented by Football Federation Australia from 2012. It is conducted by the Football Federation South Australia, the state's governing body.

2023 State League 2 Clubs

References

4
Sports leagues established in 2015
2015 establishments in Australia
Fourth level football leagues in Asia